The US Bancorp Center is a 467-ft (142 m) tall skyscraper in Minneapolis, Minnesota, United States. Completed in 2000, the 32-story building is the 15th-tallest in the city. It serves as corporate headquarters for US Bancorp (also referred to as US Bank) and Piper Sandler. A skyway connects the building to the former Macy's/Daytons department store building, and Target. Several low-rise buildings were demolished to make way for this building, including the 808 Building. This is one of the three contiguous blocks designed by Ellerbe Becket from 1998 to 2001. The other two are 900 Nicollet Plaza and Target Plaza. It is the second-tallest office building completed in the United States in 2000, after the Ameriprise Financial Center, also in Minneapolis. The building was among those damaged by rioting during the George Floyd protests in Minneapolis–Saint Paul in May 2020.

See also
List of tallest buildings in Minneapolis

References

Emporis

Skyscraper office buildings in Minneapolis
Office buildings completed in 2000
2000 establishments in Minnesota
Bank company headquarters in the United States